Assoul is a town in Tinghir Province, Drâa-Tafilalet, Morocco.

References

Populated places in Tinghir Province